See Ya 'Round is the tenth and final studio album by New Zealand's premier new wave band, Split Enz, and was released in 1984, following the departure of founding member Tim Finn, whose solo career had officially taken off the year before. Remaining songwriter Neil Finn, claiming to be a little daunted by the prospect of leading his older brother's band, subsequently announced that this would be the final Split Enz studio recording. Since he only had an EP's worth of material ready, the record was filled out by lightweight, experimental contributions from each of the other band members. In interviews, Neil has revealed that the original EP was to have been the first five tracks on the album ("Breakin' My Back" through "Years Go By").

Neil Finn's demos from this era included an early version of the future Crowded House hit, "Something So Strong" (at this point a ballad), as well as prototypes for "I Walk Away" (known as "Love and Success" and "Your Inspiration"), and "Can't Carry On". Tim Finn had also recorded a collection of demos at Sing Sing Studios for the next Enz album, but his departure ensured that they would remain unreleased.

The album's lead single, "I Walk Away," had a low-budget video clip which features the band protruding their faces through theatrical costume cut-outs, much like on the artwork of the album. The song was also released on a 12" single, featuring an of-its-era extended remix. Neither single nor album were released in the US, because after most copies of 1983's Conflicting Emotions ended up in bargain bins, the American label A&M would not risk another potential Split Enz failure and dropped them from the roster. "I Walk Away" was later re-recorded (with a different verse) and re-released on the U.S. issue of the first Crowded House album, as it was new to U.S. audiences. Originally intended as a goodbye to the Enz, key parts of the song were rewritten for the Crowded House album, supposedly to reflect Neil's uncertainty of venturing away from the security of the Enz.

See Ya 'Round was initially released only in Australia and New Zealand, charting at #29 and #5, respectively. A later release in Canada featured a grey border on the cover instead of an orange one.

After an appearance on Countdown and the release of "One Mouth Is Fed" as a follow-up single, the band decided to end with a proper goodbye and beckoned Tim Finn back for one final "Enz With a Bang" tour. It is on this tour that Neil met future Crowded House bassist and collaborator, Nick Seymour. A live album was released a year later featuring songs from the three Melbourne shows of this tour and the 1982 Time and Tide tour.

Track listing
 Songs written by Neil Finn, except where noted.

 "Breakin' My Back"
 "I Walk Away"
 "Doctor Love"
 "One Mouth Is Fed"
 "Years Go By" (N.Finn, E.Rayner)
 "Voices"
 "The Lost Cat" (E.Rayner)
 "Adz" (N.Griggs)
 "This Is Massive" (P.Hester)
 "Kia Kaha (Ever Be Strong)"
 "Ninnie Knees Up" (N.Crombie)

2006 Re-release 

 Songs written by Neil Finn, except where noted.

 "Breakin' My Back" – 3:54
 "I Walk Away" – 3:50
 "Doctor Love" – 4:18
 "One Mouth Is Fed" – 3:27
 "Years Go By" (N.Finn, E.Rayner) – 4:15
 "Voices" – 3:31
 "The Lost Cat" (E.Rayner) – 5:41
 "Adz" (N.Griggs) – 4:11
 "This Is Massive" (P.Hester) – 3:48
 "Kia Kaha" – 3:38
 "Ninnie Knees Up" (N.Crombie) – 3:20
 "Next Exit" (T.Finn)* – 3:15

The first edition of the re-release accidentally includes "Mr. Catalyst," a Tim Finn song, while the packaging is incorrectly labelled as "Next Exit", which does not appear on the album. Though either bonus track is an odd choice, as both are Tim Finn songs and the album does not otherwise feature Tim at all, "Mr. Catalyst" is at least from a 1984 recording session. "Mr. Catalyst" was later released on the 1992 rarities album, "Rear Enz". "Next Exit," on the other hand, was released as a non-album single in 1983 prior to the release of Conflicting Emotions and was originally recorded with extra verses during the late '70s Luton sessions. The standard edition of the re-release properly includes "Next Exit" as listed on the packaging, though it is a 3:15 edit rather than the full-length 3:40 version available on previous album releases.
"Breakin' My Back" is listed on the re-release as "Breaking My Back" in all instances but one.

Personnel 
Split Enz

All tracks on original album except "Kia Kaha"
 Neil Finn – lead vocals except where noted, backing vocals, guitar
 Eddie Rayner – keyboards, synthesizer, backing vocals
 Noel Crombie – percussion, backing vocals, lead vocals on "Ninnie Knees Up"
 Nigel Griggs – bass, backing vocals, all instruments and vocals on "Adz"
 Paul Hester – drums, backing vocals, lead vocals on "This is Massive" 
"Kia Kaha" and 2006 re-release bonus tracks
 Neil Finn – vocals, guitar
 Eddie Rayner – keyboards
 Noel Crombie – drums
 Nigel Griggs – bass
 Tim Finn – vocals, piano, guitar
Additional musicians
 Wilbur Wilde – saxophone on "Voices"
 Bob Venier – flugelhorn on "The Lost Cat" (incorrectly referred to in the liner notes of some copies by its working title, "Isolation")
 International Management – Nathan D. Brenner

Charts

Certifications

References

Split Enz albums
1984 albums
Albums produced by James Barton (producer)
Mushroom Records albums